María Luisa Manrique de Lara y Gonzaga, Marchioness of la Laguna, 11th Countess of Paredes (April 17, 1649 – September 4, 1721) was by birth member of the House of Gonzaga and Vicereine of New Spain by virtue of marriage.

Early life

She was born as the eldest daughter of Vespasiano Vincenzo Gonzaga (1621–1687), Viceroy of Valencia, and María Inés Manrique de Lara, 10th Countess of Paredes de Nava. Her siblings included Maria Josefa, future Marquesa de Malpica, Isabella and Diego who both died young.

Biography
She married Tomás de la Cerda, 3rd Marquis of la Laguna de Camero Viejo, thus becoming vicereine of New Spain from 1680 to 1686.

In 1680, The Cabildo commissioned two triumphal arches for the arrival of the Marquises of la Laguna de Camero Viejo, the new Viceroys, to Mexico City. The first, displayed in Santo Domingo, was created by Carlos de Sigüenza y Góngora. The second, displayed in the Mexico City Cathedral, was the allegorical Neptune of Sor Juana Inés de la Cruz. Sor Juana compares the new Viceroy with Neptune and his wife, Maria Luisa, with Amphitrite, the goddess of the sea.

The only son of María Luisa, José María de la Cerda y Manrique de Lara was born on July 5, 1683, and Sor Juana also dedicated poems to the event. He was baptized on July 14, 1683, by the Archbishop Aguiar y Seijas in the Metropolitan Cathedral of Mexico City.

Juana Inés de la Cruz

She was the patron of Juana Inés de la Cruz and she supported the nun and had her works published in Spain

Sor Juana dedicated several poems to her. Just as Leonor Carreto was "Laura" in the poems that Sor Juana dedicated to her, Doña Maria Luisa was "Lysi". Octavio Paz dedicated a chapter of his book "Sor Juana Inés de la Cruz o Las trampas de la fe" (Sor Juana Ines de la Cruz or the traps of the faith) to the relationship between the virreina and the poet. Publisher Flores Raras published a compilation of poems that Sor Juana dedicated to the virreina entitled "Un amar ardiente" (An ardent love) edited by Sergio Téllez-Pon. Dona Maria Luisa also appears as a character in the movie "Yo, la peor de todas" (I, the worst of all) by Maria Luisa Bemberg and in the limited TV series "Juana Inés" aired on Canal Once.

Sor Juana presented her play "Los empeños de una casa" (The Pawns of a House) for Maria Luisa and her husband, as well as Archbishop Francisco de Aguiar y Seijas. In the work Sor Juana includes several verses in honor of Maria Luisa such as "Divina Lysi".

Dona Maria Luisa published the book of poems of Sor Juana "Inundación Castálida" (Castálida Flood) in 1689 in Madrid. The second volume was published a few years later in Seville.

Death
María Luisa Manrique de Lara y Gonzaga died on September 4, 1721, in  Bergamo, Lombardy, Italy.

In popular culture 
Dona Maria Luisa is featured as a recurring character in the Spanish-language Canal Once television mini-series Juana Ines, from episodes 4 through 6.

References

1649 births
1721 deaths
House of Gonzaga
17th-century Italian nobility
Viceroys of New Spain